Paris Follies of 1956 is a 1955 American film directed by Leslie Goodwins. The film is also known as Fresh from Paris in the United States (TV title) and the working title of the film.  The film showcases several acts filmed at Frank Sennes' Moulin Rouge Night Club in 1954.

Plot 
Dan Bradley owns and operates a Hollywood, California nightclub and is in love with Ruth Harmon, a stage designer for his shows. Dan's a happy man because talented singer Margaret Walton is his headliner and wealthy Alfred Gaylord his financial backer.

Then things go wrong. Margaret, jealous of Ruth, threatens to quit if Dan pays attention to anyone except her. Gaylord's son shows up to take Alfred back to a sanitarium, revealing his father to be irresponsible, not rich.

Margaret's sister, cigarette girl Barbara, manages to persuade Dan's close pal Chuck Russell to audition her to be her sister's understudy. Her timing is good because Margaret gets angry at Dan and does indeed walk off. Barbara, however, gets stage fright and can't go on, resulting in big sister Margaret coming full circle to be the understudy's understudy. She sings and is a great success.

Cast 
Forrest Tucker as Dan Bradley
Margaret Whiting as Margaret Walton
Dick Wesson as Chuck Russell
Martha Hyer as Ruth Harmon
Barbara Whiting as Barbara Walton
Lloyd Corrigan as Alfred Gaylord
Wally Cassell as Harry
Fluff Charlton as Taffy
James Ferris as Jim
William Henry as Wendell
The Sportsmen Quartet as Themselves
Frank Parker as himself

Soundtrack

References

External links 

1955 films
1955 musical films
Films directed by Leslie Goodwins
American musical films
Allied Artists films
1950s English-language films
1950s American films